The 12th Pan American Junior Athletics Championships were held in Bridgetown, Barbados at the National Stadium on 18–20 July 2003. Jamaican sprinter Usain Bolt had the outstanding performance
equalling the 200m World Junior record, while the team of the USA dominated
the championships gaining 48 medals.

Participation (unofficial)

Detailed result lists can be found on the CACAC, the CFPI, the
USA Track & Field, and the "World Junior Athletics History"
website. An unofficial count yields the number of about 352
athletes from about 31 countries:  Antigua and Barbuda (7), Argentina (12),
Bahamas (6), Barbados (17), Bolivia (1), Brazil (22), British Virgin Islands
(2), Canada (46), Cayman Islands (1), Chile (14), Colombia (11), Costa Rica
(2), Cuba (6), Dominica (2), Dominican Republic (3), Ecuador (6), El Salvador
(3), Grenada (4), Guyana (3), Jamaica (34), Mexico (21), Netherlands Antilles
(1), Nicaragua (1), Peru (5), Puerto Rico (11), Saint Lucia (5), Saint Vincent
and the Grenadines (2), Trinidad and Tobago (14), United States (72),
U.S. Virgin Islands (1), Venezuela (17).

Medal summary
Medal winners are published.
Complete results can be found on the CACAC, the CFPI on the USA Track & Field and on the "World Junior Athletics History"
website.

Men

Women

Medal table (unofficial)

The medal count has been published. It is in agreement with the following unofficial medal count.

References

External links
World Junior Athletics History

Pan American U20 Athletics Championships
2003 in Barbadian sport
Pan American U20 Championships
International athletics competitions hosted by Barbados
2003 in youth sport